French leave may refer to:
 French leave, a leave of absence without permission or without announcing one's departure
 French Leave (novel), by Wodehouse
 French Leave (de Larrabeiti), memoirs 
 French Leave (play), a play by Reginald Berkeley
 French Leave (1930 film), a British film adaptation
 French Leave (1937 film), a British film adaptation
 French Leave (1948 film), an American comedy film